Seripha pyrrhocrocis is a moth in the subfamily Arctiinae. It was described by Felder and Rogenhofer in 1875. It is found in Colombia.

References

Moths described in 1875
Lithosiini